Sheung Wan is one of the 15 constituencies in the Central and Western District of Hong Kong, represented from 1994 to 2021 by Kam Nai-wai of the Democratic Party in the Central and Western District Council.

The constituency is loosely based on the Sheung Wan area with estimated population of 14,981.

Boundaries 
Sheung Wan constituency is roughly based on the northwestern portion of Sheung Wan area, bounded on the west by Wilmer Street, on the south by Queen's Road West and Hollywood Road, on the east by Ladder Street and Cleverly Street, and on the north by Victoria Harbour.

The entrances/exits of MTR Sheung Wan station, which are all located east of Cleverly Street, are thus not within the boundaries of the constituency, belonging to the neighbouring Chung Wan constituency instead, as is the eastern part of the Sheung Wan where Infinitus Plaza and Wing On Centre are located. Also, the part of Sheung Wan between Hollywood Road and Caine Road belongs to the Tung Wah constituency.

Bordering Sheung Wan are the constituencies of Chung Wan, Sai Ying Pun and Tung Wah.

Councillors represented 
The seat has been held by Kam Nai-wai since 1994. A founding member of the Democratic Party, Kam was a lawmaker representing the Hong Kong Island geographical constituency from 2008 to 2012.

1982 to 1985

1985 to 1994

1994 to present

Election results

2010s

2000s

1990s

1980s

Notes

Citations

References
2011 District Council Election Results (Central & Western)
2007 District Council Election Results (Central & Western)
2003 District Council Election Results (Central & Western)
1999 District Council Election Results (Central & Western)
 

Constituencies of Hong Kong
1994 in Hong Kong
1999 in Hong Kong
2003 in Hong Kong
2007 in Hong Kong
2011 in Hong Kong
Constituencies of Central and Western District Council
1982 establishments in Hong Kong
Constituencies established in 1982
Sheung Wan